Léon Corthals (1877 – 1935) was a Belgian painter.

Corthals was born in Temse in 1877. He painted a portrait of Leopold III of Belgium on 23 February 1934, the day of his ascension to the Belgian throne.

He died in Elsene in 1935.

Gallery

References

External links

1877 births
1935 deaths
People from Temse
19th-century Belgian painters
19th-century Belgian male artists
20th-century Belgian painters
Nude art
20th-century Belgian male artists